Augelite is an aluminium phosphate mineral with formula: Al2(PO4)(OH)3. The shade varies from colorless to white, yellow or rose. Its crystal system is monoclinic.

It was first described by Christian Wilhelm Blomstrand for an occurrence in Västanå iron mine  at Scania, Sweden in 1868 and derives its name from the Greek αύγή in reference to its pearly lustre.

It occurs as a product of metamorphism of phosphate bearing peraluminous sediments and in high-temperature hydrothermal ore deposits. It occurs in association with attakolite, svanbergite, lazulite, hematite, trolleite, berlinite, rutile,  pyrophyllite, baryte, arsenopyrite, stannite, pyrite, andorite, cassiterite and zinkenite.

References

Phosphate minerals
Monoclinic minerals
Minerals in space group 12